Qintex Limited was an Australian financial services company founded in 1975 as Takeovers, Equities & Management Securities (TEAM). It was renamed Qintex Limited and came to prominence in 1986, collapsing five years later in 1991. Its main shareholder and Managing Director was Christopher Skase.

At its peak, Qintex owned interests in Channel 7, Mirage Resorts, Hardy Brothers jewellery retail concern and a number of other businesses.

Its headquarters was in Brisbane, Australia.

History
Qintex was established in 1975 by Christopher Skase and his partners. Skase expanded the company substantially, initially into retail with investments in Hardy Bros and car dealer Nettlefolds. Qintex also expanded into property development.

In 1984, Qintex bought television station TVQ-0 in Brisbane. Later Qintex purchased HSV-7 and ATN-7 in Melbourne and Sydney from John Fairfax & Sons. In 1986, the company invested in an entertainment company named Qintex Entertainment (today Sonar Entertainment), formed by the merger of American studios Hal Roach Studios and Robert Halmi Incorporated.

In 1989, the company was struggling to meet interest payments and sold its share in Mirage Resorts for in excess of $433 million.

Collapse
The first signs of collapse showed in October 1989, when the American subsidiary filed for Chapter 11 bankruptcy protection after Qintex failed to provide financing for a debt payment. The Australian Stock Exchange suspended Qintex's stock shortly after when the company failed to respond to questions of its financial health. A month later, in November 1989, Qintex Ltd went into receivership with debts of over A$1.9 billion. The collapse happened just six weeks after the company lost a bid to acquire MGM/UA studios for A$1.5 billion.

Its collapse was prompted by what was later seen as an excessive amount of debt in the business.

This coincided with very high interest rates that prevailed in 1989. When the company missed interest payments and was not able to renegotiate its position with the Commonwealth Bank, the bank appointed a receiver to the company.

It was in 1991 that bank-appointed receivers created Seven Network Limited in order to bundle together the company's assets.

References

Companies based in Brisbane
Defunct financial services companies of Australia
Financial services companies established in 1975
Financial services companies disestablished in 1991
Australian companies disestablished in 1991
Australian companies established in 1975
Corporate scandals